The Mountsorrel Cross is a market cross  that dates from the Middle Ages. It originally stood on Main Street in the village of Mountsorrel, Leicestershire, but was moved in the late 18th century to a position 250 metres south-east of St Leonard's Church, Swithland, where it still stands.  It is a Grade I listed feature.

References

External links 
 - Mountsorrel Cross

Grade I listed buildings in Leicestershire
Market crosses in England
Borough of Charnwood